Lieutenant-General Sir Philip Maxwell Balfour  (10 March 1898 – 4 February 1977) was a senior British Army officer who achieved high office in the 1950s.

Military career
Philip Balfour was born on 10 March 1898 and was educated at Wellington College, Berkshire, and the Royal Military Academy, Woolwich. He was commissioned as a second lieutenant into the Royal Artillery on 28 July 1915, alongside Cameron Nicholson and John Kennedy of the Royal Garrison Artillery. He served in the First World War being deployed to France and Belgium. He attended the Staff College, Camberley from 1929 to 1930.

He also served in the Second World War, initially as a GSO2 before being made Commander, Royal Artillery (CRA) of the 55th (West Lancashire) Infantry Division. From 1944 he was serving as Brigadier General Staff (BGS) of John Crocker's I Corps throughout the North West Europe campaign, and was awarded the CBE for 'gallant and distinguished services in Normandy' as a temporary brigadier.

After the War he joined the Control Commission in Germany in 1945 and then became Director of Civil Affairs for the Military Government, British Army of the Rhine (BAOR) in 1946. He was appointed General Officer Commanding 53rd (Welsh) Infantry Division later in 1946 and then GOC 2nd Division in 1947. Finally he became General Officer Commanding-in-Chief Northern Command in 1949; in that role he was critical of the standard of shooting in the British Army. He retired in 1953.

References

External links
Generals of World War II

|-

|-
 

1898 births
1977 deaths
British Army lieutenant generals
British Army generals of World War II
British Army personnel of World War I
Companions of the Order of the Bath
Graduates of the Royal Military Academy, Woolwich
Graduates of the Staff College, Camberley
Knights Commander of the Order of the British Empire
People educated at Wellington College, Berkshire
Recipients of the Military Cross
Royal Artillery officers